The 64th Massachusetts General Court, consisting of the Massachusetts Senate and the Massachusetts House of Representatives, met in 1843 during the governorship of Marcus Morton. Phineas W. Leland and Frederick Robinson served as presidents of the Senate and Daniel P. King served as speaker of the House.

Senators

Representatives

 C. F. Adams 
 Geo. T. Bigelow 
 James Blake

See also
 28th United States Congress
 List of Massachusetts General Courts

References

External links
 
 

Political history of Massachusetts
Massachusetts legislative sessions
massachusetts
1843 in Massachusetts